The Quetachou River is a river in the Côte-Nord region of the province of Quebec, Canada. It empties into the Gulf of Saint Lawrence.

Location

The Quetachou River rises above Lac de la Robe Noire, which drains Lac François and Lac Gendron.
It enters the Baie Quetachou from the northwest. 
The Veronique River enters the bay from the northeast.
The mouth of the river is in the municipality of Baie-Johan-Beetz in the Minganie Regional County Municipality.
The origin of the name is not known. It was made official on 5 December 1968.

In the summer of 2013 the forests to the north of the village were burned by a forest fire, including those along the footpath.
Two years later a TV show featured the work of nine artists on restoring the beauty of the trail.
The work, titled Quétachou : résilience du territoire (Quétachou: resilience of the territory) was helped by several members of the local community.
The semi-permanent works installed in the forest will gradually deteriorate as nature regenerates.

Basin

The Quetachou River basin is partially in the unorganized territory of Lac-Jérôme and partially in the municipality of Baie-Johan-Beetz.
Lakes in the watershed include Lac Uhu, Lacs de la Cabane Brûlée, Lac Devost, Lac Croche, Lac Bellanger, Lac Napoléon, Lac Beetz, Lac Noroy, Lac de la Robe Noire, Lac François and Lac Gendron.
A map of the ecological regions of Quebec shows the river in sub-regions 6j-T and 6m-T of the east spruce/moss subdomain.

Lac de la Robe Noire

Lac de la Robe Noire (Black Robe Lake) drains Lac François and Lac Gendron.
It is drained by the Quetachou River, which flows through lakes Beaulieu and Beetz to the Gulf.
It has many islands, and its shore includes several peninsulas.
According to the surveyor Hould (1899) the lake is full of trout, and is near the source of the large river Piasthibaie (Piashti River).
The Club Lac de la Robe Noire has exclusive fishing rights as an outfitter.

The 1914 Dictionary of Rivers and Lakes of the Province of Quebec said the name was recent and referred to Catholic missionaries who came to catechise the Innu.
Often missionaries were the first Europeans to visit the region. They were called "black robes" (robes noires) after their long black soutances.
The Innu language name for the lake is Matnipi, or "Bad Lake".

Lac Bellanger

It is fed by the Bellanger River.
It is named after the Abbé Joseph-Marie Bellanger, grand vicar of the bishop of Newfoundland, missionary in La Tabatière, a village of the Basse-Côte-Nord and author of a Grammar of the Mi'kmaq language (1864). 
The Innu call the lake Pepaukamau, or lake with several straits.

Lacs de la Cabane Brûlée

The Lacs de la Cabane Brûlée (Burnt Cabin Lakes) are to the west of the Quetachou River. 
They would be named after a cabin that burned on the edge of one of the lakes. 
They are also known as the Lacs Brûlé (Burnt Lakes).

Lac Noroy

Lac Noroy is named after Jean Bochart de Champigny (d. 1720), Lord of Noroy and Verneuil, sixth intendant of New France (1686-1702).

Notes

Sources

Rivers of Côte-Nord